All of the business loops within Texas are maintained by the Texas Department of Transportation (TxDOT). Interstate 20 (I-20) has 15 business loops in the state, all located in western Texas. Along I-20, TxDOT identifies each business route as Business Interstate 20 followed by an alphabetic suffix. Along Texas Interstates, the alphabetic suffixes on business route names ascend eastward and northward. There are gaps in the alphabetic values to allow for future system expansion. The alphabetic naming suffixes are included as small letters on the bottom of route shields.

I-20 business routes in Texas generally follow the path of the former U.S. Route 80 (US 80) through the central portions of towns now bypassed by the Interstate route.

Pecos–Barstow business loop

Business Interstate 20-B (Bus. I-20-B) is a business loop of I-20 that passes through Pecos and Barstow in Reeves and Ward counties. The  route, commissioned in 1991, begins at I-20 exit 37 and ends at exit 52. In Pecos, the route runs along Third St. The route has major intersections with US 285, State Highway 17 (SH 17), and three Farm to Market Roads.

The route was originally designated as part of US 80 until US 80 was decommissioned in western Texas in 1991.

Monahans business loop

Business Interstate 20-D (Bus. I-20-D) is a business loop of I-20 that passes through Monahans in Ward County commissioned in 1991. The  route begins at I-20 exit 76 and runs along Sealy Ave. returning to the Interstate at exit 83. The route has major intersections with SH 18, State Highway Spur 57 (Spur 57), and State Highway Loop 464 (Loop 464).

The route, together with Spur 57, was originally designated as part of US 80 until US 80 was decommissioned in western Texas in 1991.

Odessa–Midland business loop

Business Interstate 20-E (Bus. I-20-E) is a business loop of I-20 that passes through Odessa and Midland in Ector and Midland counties. The  loop, commissioned in 1991, begins at I-20 exit 112 in West Odessa and ends at I-20 exit 144 east of Midland. In West Odessa and Odessa, the route is known as Second Street and intersects SH 302 and US 385. Between Odessa and Midland, the route intersects SH 349 connecting the business loop to Midland International Airport. In Midland, the route begins as Wall Street and intersects SH 158. At Spur 268, the business loop turns onto Front Street and continues along that street to its terminus.

The business loop follows the previous path of US 80 through Odessa and Midland between 1952 and 1991 when US 80 was decommissioned in western Texas. Before 1952, US 80 in Midland continued along Wall Street following the present Spur 268, Business State Highway 158-B (Bus. SH 158-B), and Spur 269 until returning to the present route. Between 1952 and 1991, this previous alignment in central Midland was signed as a US 80 business route although it carried state loop and spur designations.

Stanton business loop

Business Interstate 20-F (Bus. I-20-F) is a business loop of I-20 that passes through Stanton in Martin County commissioned in 1995. The  route begins at I-20 exit 154 and runs along Front St. through Stanton to its terminus at I-20 exit 158. The route has one major intersection with SH 137.

When this section of US 80 was decommissioned on August 28, 1991, this section was designated as State Highway Loop 214 (Loop 214). This designation was replaced by the current Interstate business route designation on March 30, 1995. The number was previously used for State Highway Spur 214 (Spur 214), designated on October 18, 1948, from SH 73 to SH 87. On January 7, 1987, this became part of SH 82.

Big Spring business loop

Business Interstate 20-G (Bus. I-20-G) is a business loop of I-20 that passes through Big Spring in Howard County commissioned in 1990. The  route begins at I-20 exit 174 and runs along Martin Luther King Jr. Blvd. before veering to the northeast and joining Third St. (westbound) and Fourth St. (eastbound) the remaining distance through town. The two streets merge just before rejoining I-20 at exit 179. The route has major intersections with US 87, SH 350, and Farm to Market Road 700 (FM 700).

The business loop largely follows the former route of US 80 through Big Spring before December 18, 1964, when US 80 was rerouted around town over I-20. At that time, the former route through town was designated as Loop 402, although it was signed as a US 80 business route until the current Interstate business route was established on June 21, 1990.

Westbrook business loop

Business Interstate 20-H (Bus. I-20-H) is a business loop of I-20 that passes through Westbrook in Mitchell County commissioned in 1990. The  route begins at I-20 exit 206 and joins FM 670 along Thorne St. to Main St. where FM 670 turns north. The business loop continues along Thorne St. to I-20 at exit 207.

The business loop follows the route of the former US 80 through Westbrook before US 80 was rerouted along the present Interstate bypass on February 27, 1958. At that time, the former route through town became State Highway Loop 333 (Loop 333) until the present Interstate business route designation began on June 21, 1990.

Colorado City business loop

Business Interstate 20-J (Bus. I-20-J) is a business loop of I-20 that passes through Colorado City in Mitchell County commissioned in 1990. The  route begins at I-20 exit 213 and runs along Second St. through Colorado City ending at I-20 exit 219B. The route has major intersections with SH 163, SH 208, FM 1983, and runs concurrently for several blocks with Bus. SH 208-B on Colorado City's east side.

The business loop follows the route of the former US 80 through Colorado City before January 14, 1963, when US 80 was rerouted along the present Interstate bypass. At that time, the former route through town was designated as State Highway Loop 377 (Loop 377), although it was signed as a US 80 business route. It retained the Loop 377 designation until June 21, 1990, when it was reclassified with its present Interstate business route designation. The number will be reused on March 26, 2020, for Spur 377 in Williamson County.

Loraine business loop

Business Interstate 20-K (Bus. I-20-K) is a business loop of I-20 that passes through Loraine in Mitchell County commissioned in 1990. The  route begins at exit 224 of I-20 and follows along Pacific Ave. through town to I-20 exit 226B. The route has a major intersection with FM 644.

The business loop follows along the route of the former US 80 through Loraine until February 26, 1957, when US 80 was rerouted along the present Interstate bypass. At that time, the former route was commissioned as State Highway Loop 316 (Loop 316) until June 21, 1990, when the route was given its present Interstate business route designation. The number, however, was reused on December 17, 2009, for Spur 316 in Pottsboro.

Roscoe business spur

Business Interstate 20-L (Bus. I-20-L) is a business spur of I-20 that serves Roscoe in Nolan County commissioned in 1990. The  route begins at I-20 exit 235 and proceeds to the northeast before turning east along First St. in Roscoe. The route terminates at Business U.S. Route 84-J (Bus. US 84-J) and FM 608.

The business spur follows the path of the former US 80 through Roscoe before 1958 when US 80 was rerouted over the present Interstate bypass. The former US 80 continued from the present eastern terminus of the business spur east along First St. then followed US 84 to the present I-20. On December 19, 1958, the present business spur was designated State Highway Spur 237 (Spur 237) and then as State Highway Loop 237 (Loop 237) on April 15, 1959, even while maintaining the current termini as a true spur. The Loop 237 designation was dropped in favor of the current Interstate business classification on June 21, 1990. Loop 237 was originally designated on September 28, 1950, from US 82 south along Robison Road to US 67 in Texarkana. This route was removed from the state highway system on September 23, 1953.

Sweetwater business loop

Business Interstate 20-M (Bus. I-20-M) is a business loop of I-20 that passes through Sweetwater in Nolan County commissioned in 1990. The  route begins at exit 241 of I-20 and US 84. The route proceeds to the northeast and at Loop 170 the route turns east along Broadway St. through town. On the east side of Sweetwater, the business loop joins SH 70 and follows that route back to I-20 and US 84 at exit 247. The route has major intersections with FM 419 and FM 1544 and runs concurrently with Bus. SH 70-G on Sweetwater's east side.

The business loop follows the former path of US 80 through Sweetwater before August 4, 1966, when US 80 was relocated along the current Interstate bypass. At that time, the former US 80 through Sweetwater was designated as State Highway Loop 432 (Loop 432), although it was signed as a US 80 business route. That designation ended with the current Interstate business route classification on June 21, 1990.

Trent business loop

Business Interstate 20-N (Bus. I-20-N) is a business loop of I-20 that passes through Trent in Taylor County commissioned in 1990. The  route begins at exit 261 of I-20 and US 84 and passes through Trent along First St. ending at exit 263 of I-10 and US 84. In Trent, the route has a major intersection with FM 1085.

The route follows the former path of US 80 through Trent before US 80 was rerouted along the current Interstate bypass on April 23, 1957. At that time, the former route of US 80 through town became designated as State Highway Loop 319 (Loop 319) until the current Interstate business route was established on June 21, 1990.

Merkel business loop

Business Interstate 20-P (Bus. I-20-P) is a business loop of I-20 that passes through Merkel in Taylor County commissioned in 1990. The  route begins at exit 267 of I-20 and US 84 and passes through Trent along First St. ending at exit 270 of I-10 and US 84. The route briefly runs concurrently with FM 126 and FM 1235.

The route follows the former US 80 through Merkel before US 80 was rerouted along the present Interstate bypass on October 30, 1958. From that time until the present Interstate business route was established on June 21, 1990, the route was designated as State Highway Loop 39 (Loop 39).

Tye business loop

Business Interstate 20-Q (Bus. I-20-Q) is a business loop of I-20 that passes through Tye in Taylor County commissioned in 1990. The  route begins along the south service road of I-20 and US 84, although it is accessed from eastbound traffic by way of FM 707 at exit 277. The route runs along North St. to Spinks Rd., which carries the route back to I-20 and US 84 at exit 278.

The North St. portion of the route was the former route of US 80 before US 80 was rerouted over the current I-20 on May 31, 1957. The old route was designated State Highway Loop 320 (Loop 320) until the current Interstate business designation was given on June 21, 1990. Before 1957 the former US 80 continued a short distance along North St. beyond Spinks Rd. parallel to the current I-20 to Bus. I-20-R and US 84. This latter section is a portion of the Bankhead Highway Historic District, listed on the National Register of Historic Places. Before the current Interstate business designation was given in 1990, the route was designated State Highway Loop 320 (Loop 320).

Abilene business loop

Business Interstate 20-R (Bus. I-20-R) is a business loop of I-20 that passes through Abilene in Taylor County commissioned in 1990. The  route begins at exit 279 of I-20 and US 84 and proceeds along with US 84 along S. First St. past FM 3438. On Abilene's west side, the route intersects US 83 and US 277 at the Winters Fwy., where US 84 turns off to the south. The route continues east along S. First St. to central Abilene where the route turns north along Bus. US 83-D at Treadaway Blvd. The route follows Treadaway Blvd. a short distance to N. Second St. where the route turns east. The route then proceeds along N. Second St. intersecting Loop 322 at the Jake Roberts Fwy. on the east side of Abilene before returning to I-20 at exit 292A.

The route follows the path of the former US 80 which joins the route in Tye approaching along North St. from Bus. I-20-Q. On September 19, 1961, the former US 80 was relocated along the current I-20 and the former route was designated as State Highway Loop 355 (Loop 355), although it was signed as a US 80 business route. This designation lasted until the current Interstate business designation began on June 21, 1990.

Baird business loop

Business Interstate 20-T (Bus. I-20-T) is a business loop of I-20 that passes through Baird in Callahan County commissioned in 1990. The  route begins at I-20 exit 306 west of Baird with Bus. I-20-T extending south of the intersection and FM 2047 following the roadway north of I-20. The route crosses through town along Fourth St. and has major intersections with US 283 and FM 18 before leaving Baird and joining I-20 at exit 308 east of town.

The route follows along the former location of US 80 through Baird before 1966 when US 80 was rerouted over the current route of I-20. At that time, the route's designation was changed to State Highway Loop 425 (Loop 425) until 1990 when the route received its current designation. The number, however, was reused on June 24, 2010, for Spur 425.

See also

References

External links

20
Interstate 20
Transportation in Callahan County, Texas
Transportation in Ector County, Texas
Transportation in Howard County, Texas
Transportation in Martin County, Texas
Transportation in Midland County, Texas
Transportation in Mitchell County, Texas
Transportation in Nolan County, Texas
Transportation in Reeves County, Texas
Transportation in Taylor County, Texas
Transportation in Ward County, Texas